Petrovka may refer to:

 Petrovka, Armenia, a town in Armenia
 Petrovka, Kyrgyzstan, a village in Chuy Region, Kyrgyzstan
 Petrovka settlement, a Bronze Age settlement in Zhambyl District, North Kazakhstan Region, Kazakhstan
 Sintashta-Petrovka-Arkaim, a sub-culture of the Andronovo culture, related to this settlement
 Petrovka, Sakha Republic, a selo in Kharansky Rural Okrug of Megino-Kangalassky District
 Rural localities in Kursk Oblast:
 Petrovka, Gorshechensky District, Kursk Oblast, a village
 Petrovka, Krasnodolinsky Selsoviet, Kastorensky District, Kursk Oblast, a village
 Petrovka, Krasnoznamensky Selsoviet, Kastorensky District, Kursk Oblast, a village
 Petrovka, Uspensky Selsoviet, Kastorensky District, Kursk Oblast, a village
 Petrovka, Medvensky District, Kursk Oblast, a khutor
 Petrovka, Shchigrovsky District, Kursk Oblast, a village
Petrovka Street, in downtown Moscow

See also
Petrivka (disambiguation)